A History Maker is a novel by Alasdair Gray first published in 1994. The sources of the novel are to be found in a play by Gray in the 1970s which was titled "The History Maker" (note the definite article).  The novel was described in  The Daily Telegraph as "Sir Walter Scott meets Rollerball" and is set in the future in the Scottish borders, when society is matriarchal and its male members amuse themselves with fighting battles as a spectator sport.

Plot summary

Like Gray's Poor Things the novel takes the form of documentation written by the characters themselves in order to record their experiences for posterity: a Prologue and notes (which make up almost a third of the total text) by "the hero's mother", and the central portion of the book, which is a third person narrative written by its protagonist, Wat Dryhope.  Wat finds himself dissatisfied with the lack of purpose in a life in which everything is provided by powerplants, bypassing any need for manual labour.  He develops an unhealthy interest in the ancient history of twentieth-century wars and dictatorships when men's struggles had a purpose, leaving himself vulnerable to exploitation to a plot to destroy his world's way of life.

1994 British novels
Novels by Alasdair Gray
Novels set in the Scottish Borders
Novels based on plays
Canongate Books books